Abulafia may refer to:

 Abulafia (surname), Sephardic Jewish surname
 Todros ben Joseph Abulafia (1225 – c. 1285), prominent Sephardic Jew
 Abraham Abulafia (1240 – c. 1291), kabbalist
 the conspiracy-generating computer in Umberto Eco's Foucault's Pendulum (named after Abraham Abulafia)
 Meir Abulafia (Ramah), major 13th-century Sephardic rabbi
 Hayyim ben Jacob Abulafia (1660–1744)
 David Abulafia (born 1949)
 Yossi Abulafia, author
 Louis Abolafia (1941–1995), artist and candidate for the United States presidency during the 1960s